My Dear Loser (My Dear Loser – ) is a 2017–2018 Thai television series each presented through one of the three segments entitled Edge of 17, Monster Romance and Happy Ever After.

Directed by Chatkaew Susiwa and produced by GMMTV, the three-part series was one of the six television series for 2017 showcased by GMMTV in their "6 Natures+" event on 2 March 2017. The premiere segment Edge of 17 was broadcast on 9 July 2017 to 3 September 2017, followed by Monster Romance (10 September 2017 to 17 December 2017) and Happy Ever After (24 December 2017 to 11 March 2018), airing on Sundays on GMM 25 and LINE TV at 20:30 ICT and 22:30 ICT, respectively.

The segment Monster Romance was among the entertainment programs that were temporarily stopped for the month of October in preparation for the royal cremation ceremonies of Thai King Bhumibol Adulyadej. It resumed broadcasting on 5 November 2017 and concluded on 11 March 2018.

Cast and characters 
Below are the cast of the series:

Main

Edge of 17 
 Korapat Kirdpan (Nanon) as Oh
 Ramida Jiranorraphat (Jane) as Peach
 Wachirawit Ruangwiwat (Chimon) as Sun
 Purim Rattanaruangwattana (Pluem) as In
 Pronpiphat Pattanasettanon (Plustor) as Copper
 Napasorn Weerayuttvilai (Puimek) as Ainam

Monster Romance 
 Thanat Lowkhunsombat (Lee) as Pong
 Worranit Thawornwong (Mook) as Namking

Happy Ever After 
 Esther Supreeleela as Korya
 Puttichai Kasetsin (Push) as Ton

Supporting

Edge of 17 
 Thanat Lowkhunsombat (Lee) as Pong (Ep. 4, 5, 6 & 9)
 Nachat Juntapun (Nicky) as Jack (Ep. 4, 5, 6 & 9)
 Harit Cheewagaroon (Sing) as Jued (Ep. 4, 5, 6 & 9)
 Achirawich Saliwattana (Gun) as Ken
 Apichaya Saejung (Ciize) as Moji
 Tipnaree Weerawatnodom (Namtan) as On
 Paweenut Pangnakorn as Jitra
 Benja Singkharawat (Yangyi) as Peach's mother
 Chinrat Siripongchawalit (Mike) as Toey
 Sirinuch Petchurai (Koi) as Oh's mother

Monster Romance 
 Harit Cheewagaroon (Sing) as Jued
 Tipnaree Weerawatnodom (Namtan) as On
 Nachat Juntapun (Nicky) as Jack
 Neen Suwanamas as Emma
 Phakjira Kanrattanasoot (Nanan) as Kris
 Chanagun Arpornsutinan (Gunsmile) as Tae
 Vonthongchai Intarawat as Pok, Pong's brother
 Panyawong Ornanong as Pong's mother
 Puttichai Kasetsin (Push) as Ton

Happy Ever After 
 Niti Chaichitathorn (Pompam) as Por
 Sivakorn Lertchuchot (Guy) as Otto
 Alysaya Tsoi (Alice) as Namo
 Paweenut Pangnakorn as Jitra
 Gornpop Janjaroen as Jeng
 Pongkool Suebsung as Win

Guest role

Happy Ever After 
 Purim Rattanaruangwattana (Pluem) as In (Ep. 8 & 12)
 Wachirawit Ruangwiwat (Chimon) as Sun (Ep. 8 & 12)
 Korapat Kirdpan (Nanon) as Oh (Ep. 8 & 12)
 Thanaboon Wanlopsirinun (Na) (Ep. 11)
 Worranit Thawornwong (Mook) as Namking (Ep. 12)
 Thanat Lowkhunsombat (Lee) as Pong (Ep. 12)
 Nachat Juntapun (Nicky) as Jack (Ep. 12)
 Harit Cheewagaroon (Sing) as Jued (Ep. 12)
 Tipnaree Weerawatnodom (Namtan) as On (Ep. 12)
 Ramida Jiranorraphat (Jane) as Peach (Ep. 12)
 Napasorn Weerayuttvilai (Puimek) as Ainam (Ep. 12)

References

External links 
 My Dear Loser on LINE TV
 GMMTV

Television series by GMMTV
Thai romance television series
Thai drama television series
2017 Thai television series debuts
2018 Thai television series endings
GMM 25 original programming